Beta-amyrin 24-hydroxylase (sophoradiol 24-hydroxylase, CYP93E1) is an enzyme with systematic name beta-amyrin,AH2:oxygen oxidoreductase (24-hydroxylating). This enzyme catalyses the following chemical reaction

 (1) beta-amyrin + AH2 + O2  24-hydroxy-beta-amyrin + A + H2O
 (2) sophoradiol + AH2 + O2  24-hydroxysophoradiol + A + H2O

Beta-amyrin 24-hydroxylase is heme-thiolate protein (P-450).

References

External links 
 

EC 1.14.99